Aintree is a suburb in Melbourne, Victoria, Australia,  west of Melbourne's Central Business District, located within the City of Melton local government area. Aintree recorded a population of 7,982 at the 2021 census.

The suburb was gazetted by the Office of Geographic Names on 9 February 2017, following a proposal for eleven new suburbs by the City of Melton; the new name officially came into effect in mid-2017. The majority of the suburb is being developed by Woodlea Estate.

Prior to the suburb's creation, the area was previously part of Rockbank.

History

On 26 October 2019, the suburb was host to a world record event. The world record broken was largest soccer lesson, with the total number of participants reaching 835. This broke the previous world record by 130 people. The event was performed at Frontier Park.

Education

The suburb is home to Bacchus Marsh Grammar's Woodlea Campus, which opened in February 2019. It is located on Frontier Avenue, located near the Woodlea Sports Ovals. The Bacchus Marsh Grammar Early Learning Centre is also located in Aintree.

Also to be located within the suburb is Aintree Primary School, which is now to open to the public since early 2021.

There are also plans for a future public secondary school.

Recreation

The suburb has many parks and open spaces, including Frontier Reserve and Aintree Recreation Reserve, home to the Melton Warriors Rugby Union Club. Other parks in the area include Boulion Park, Arbourton Park, Wireless Park, Jackwood Park and Nugget Park.

References

External links

Suburbs of Melbourne
Suburbs of the City of Melton